Marmaronchis is a genus of air-breathing sea slugs, a shell-less marine pulmonate gastropod mollusks in the family Onchidiidae.

Species
Species within the genus Marmaronchis  include:
 Marmaronchis marmoratus (Lesson, 1831)
 Marmaronchis vaigiensis (Quoy & Gaimard, 1825)

References

External links
 Dayrat B., Goulding T.C., Khalil M., Lozouet P. & Tan S.H. (2018). Systematic revision one clade at a time: A new genus of onchidiid slugs from the Indo-West Pacific (Gastropoda: Euthyneura: Pulmonata). Raffles Bulletin of Zoology. 66: 814-837

Onchidiidae